Tarot games are card games played with tarot decks, that is, decks with numbered permanent trumps parallel to the suit cards. The games and decks which English-speakers call by the French name Tarot are called Tarocchi in the original Italian, Tarock in German and various similar words in other languages. The basic rules first appeared in the manuscript of Martiano da Tortona, written before 1425. The games are known in many variations, mostly cultural and regional.

Tarot games originated in Italy, and spread to most parts of Europe, notable exceptions being the British Isles, the Iberian peninsula, and the Balkans. The earliest detailed description of rules for a Tarot game in any language were published by the Abbé de Marolles in Nevers in 1637.

Tarot card games are played with decks having four ordinary suits, and one additional, longer suit of tarots, which are always trumps. They are characterised by the rule that a player who cannot follow to a trick with a card of the suit led must play a trump to the trick if possible. Tarot games have introduced the concept of trumps to card games. More recent tarot games borrowed features from other games like bidding from Ombre and winning the last trick with the lowest trump from Trappola.

Tarot decks did not precede decks having four suits of the same length, and they were invented not for occult purposes but purely for gaming. In 1781, Court de Gébelin published an essay associating the cards with ancient wisdom, the earliest record of this idea, subsequently debunked by Dummett. As a result of the unsupported theories of de Gébelin and other occultists, tarot cards have since been used for cartomancy and divination as well as gaming, although nowadays fortune-tellers tend to use specially-developed tarot decks rather than those used for games.

Tarot games are increasingly popular in Europe, especially in France where French Tarot is the second most popular card game after Belote. In Austria, Tarock games, especially Königrufen, have become widespread and there are several major national and international tournaments each year. Italy, the home of Tarot, remains a stronghold, and games of the Tarot family are also played in Hungary, Slovenia, Liechtenstein, Czechia, Slovakia, Switzerland, Denmark, south Germany and south Poland. Tarot games, however, have yet to be common in the British Isles or the Iberian Peninsula.

The cards of the special suit in these games are variously called tarocks, tarocs, taroks, tarocchi or tarots.

Classification 
Dummett classified Tarot games into three distinct types:

 Type I – in which there are other trumps with a scoring value greater than one point in addition to the Fool, the XXI and the I. These are only found in Italy.
 Type II – in which there are 3 high-value trumps, but the Fool is used as an 'excuse'.
 Type III – in which there are also 3 high-value trumps, but the Fool is the top trump.

Type I – the Tarocchi/Tarocchini group 

Tarocchi (Italian, singular Tarocco), and similar names in other languages, is a specific form of playing card deck used for different trick-taking games. An earlier name of the game Trionfi is first recorded in the diary of Giusto Giusti in September 1440 (in other early documents also ludus triumphorum or similar). The name Tarochi was first used in Ferrara June 1505, the name Taraux appeared in Avignon in  December of the same year. The names Tarocco, Tarocchi and Tarot developed in later times beside different writing forms. The poet Francesco Berni still mocked on this word in his Capitolo del Gioco della Primiera written in 1526. The name Trionfi developed later as a general term for trick-taking games (Triomphe in French, Trumpfen in German and Trump in English) and persisted as the name for the trumps in Tarot packs even when they had been renamed Tarocchi. Other different games claimed the name without any use of Tarocchi cards. The first basic rules for the game of Tarocco appear in the manuscript of Martiano da Tortona, the next are known from the year 1637.

Excluding Piedmontese tarocchi, which is more closely related to French tarot, Italian tarocchi are all of Type I, i.e. they have trumps other than the I and XXI that are worth more than one card point. Winning the final trick (ultimo) awards a set number of points. Sicilian tarocchi is played in only four towns with 63 cards from the Tarocco Siciliano deck. Tarocchini is confined to Bologna and uses the 62 card Tarocco Bolognese deck. These games have four face cards in each suit but dropped some of their pip cards early in their history. Both decks include 21 trumps and The Fool, a suitless card that excuses the player from following suit.

Type II – the Tarot group 

The French adopted tarot games after their occupation of Milan in the late 15th century. French Tarot, known locally as Jeu de Tarot, is one which uses the full 78-card Tarot deck. Originally played with the Italian-suited Tarot de Marseille, the game is now played with the French-suited Tarot Nouveau. The Tarot Nouveau, of Frankfurt origin, has trumps which depict scenes of traditional social activities; this differs from the Renaissance allegorical motifs found in Italian-suited Tarot decks such as the Tarot de Marseille, Tarocco Piemontese and the Tarocco Bolognese. Jeu de Tarot is now the most popular card game in France after Belote and many tournaments are held by the Fédération Française de Tarot.

A Tarot Nouveau deck consists of 56 cards of four suits and 22 emblematic cards called atouts (trumps). Each suit consists of fourteen cards: ten pip cards, and four face cards: the Roi (King), Dame (Queen), Cavalier (Knight), and Valet (Jack). Of the atouts, 21 are numbered from 1 to 21, and a non-numbered card called "Fou" ("Fool", also called "Mat" or "L'Excuse" in play) which "excuses" the player from following suit. Of the atouts, only the Fool and trumps 1 and 21 are considered to be "counting" cards because they are worth more than 1 point. Winning the last trick awards bonuses only if it is won with the lowest trump.

Tarot games from Piedmont, the Italian region bordering France, are more similar to French tarot than other Italian games. These games use the 78-card Tarocco Piemontese deck which was derived from the Tarot de Marseille. The most common Piedmontese tarot games are Scarto, Mitigati, Chiamare il Re, and Partita which can be found in Pinerolo and Turin. Troccas, a Swiss tarot game, is also related and is played with the 78-card Swiss 1JJ Tarot, another derivative of the Tarot de Marseille. Danish Grosstarok, which focuses on winning the final trick, also uses the Tarot Nouveau.

Type III – the Tarock group 

Tarock games, Dummett's Type III, differ from other forms in the function of the Fool which is now simply the highest trump. Games of this category include Cego, Zwanzigerrufen and Königrufen. These games use the 54 card French suited Cego or Industrie und Glück decks that strip certain pip cards.  The games are widely played in the Upper Rhine valley and its surrounding hills such as the Black forest or the Vosges, and the countries within the boundaries of the former Austro-Hungarian Monarchy, for which even the name 'Tarockania' (Tarockanien) has been coined: the Austrian variation of the game (and the variations thereof) is thus still widely popular among all classes and generations in Slovenia and Croatia, while in Hungary different rules are applied. The Swiss game of Troggu is believed to be an intermediary form linking the older tarot games to the Central European ones.

Sub-types 
The individual tarock game variants differ too widely from one another to give a general description of play. However, they can be grouped by sub-type:

 Tapp Tarock: the 3-player game that is the ancestor of modern 54-card Austrian and Hungarian Tarock games
 Cego: A south German game with a large blind that can be used as a replacement hand
 Partner calling games:
 Calling a king: Königrufen and Slovenian tarok
 Calling trump 19: Neunzehnerrufen and Czech taroky
 Calling trump 20: Zwanzigerrufen and Hungarian tarokk
 Royal tarokk: The talon, card points, and partner calling are abandoned in favour of bonuses
 Played with standard cards but with tarock features and often called "Tarock"

The last group is a family of games that emerged as result of the attempt to play Grosstarock with a normal 36-card German-suited pack. Instead of the dedicated trump suit, Hearts is chosen as the trump suit or at least as a preference suit. This family includes German Tarok, Württemberg Tarock or Tapp, Bavarian Tarock, Bauerntarock, Frog and Dobbm. They are Ace-Ten games that incorporate features of Tapp Tarock, but are not true tarock games.

List 
The following true tarock variants are known:

Two-hand games, 54 cards
 Strohmandeln: oldest and simplest two-hander, Austria
 Kosakeln: more elaborate game, Austria

Three-hand games, 42 or 54 cards
 Grosstarock (Viennese) A modern, Viennese game, not related to classical Grosstarock. (54 cards, 3 players)
 Husarln: 42 cards, elaborate game, Austria
 Illustrated Tarock: 54 cards, elaboration of Tapp Tarock, Austria
 Point Tarock: 54 cards, point bidding version of Tapp Tarock, Austria
 Tapp-Tarock: 42 or 54 cards, the original game, Austria
 Dreiertarock: 42 or 54 cards, modern descendant of Tapp Tarock, Austria
 Cego: three-player variant of Cego – see below
 Dreierles: south German descendant of Tapp Tarock played with Cego cards

Three-hand games, 78 cards
 Grosstarock, oldest German Tarock game
 Danish Tarok, only surviving variant of the above
 French Tarot, most popular card game in France after Belote

Four-hand games, 40, 42 or 54 cards
 Cego: south German game popular in the Black Forest and Upper Rhine region
 Hungarian Tarock: 40, 42 (mostly), 46 or (rarely) 54 cards, Hungary, Transylvania (growing community in Austria)
 Königrufen: 54 cards, the leading four-player game in Austria, Slovenia, Rumania, Ukraine, Poland
 Neunzehnerrufen: 54 cards. Austria, Czechia, Slovakia, Poland
 Zwanzigerrufen: 40 cards, Austria

Multi-player games
 Troggu: 62 cards, 3 to 8 players, Switzerland, Canton of Wallis (Type II/III)

Common features

Deck of cards 
A complete Tarot deck such as one for French Tarot contains the full 78-card complement and can be used to play any game in the family with the exception of Minchiate, an extinct game that used 97 cards. Austrian-Hungarian Tarock and Italian Tarocco decks, however, are a smaller subset (of 63, 54, 40, or even 36 cards) suitable only for games of a particular region. Regional tarot decks commonly feature culture-specific suits; the German suits of Hearts, Bells, Acorns and Leaves are used through most of Germanic Europe, the Latin suits of Cups, Coins, Clubs, and Swords are common in Italy and Spain, and the French suits of Hearts, Diamonds, Clubs, and Spades are seen in France, Quebec, West Germany and most of the English-speaking world. This trend continues even to non-Tarot decks such as for the German game of Skat (played with a deck of similar-value cards as in the French piquet deck used for Belote; players in most of western Germany use French suits while players in Bavaria and eastern Germany use German suits).

The 78-card tarot deck contains:
14 cards each in four suits (French or Latin depending on the region): "pip" cards numbered one (but called Ace) through ten; plus four court cards, a Jack (or Knave or Valet), a Knight (or Cavalier), a Queen, and a King.
The 21 tarots function in the game as a permanent suit of trumps.
The Fool, also known as the Excuse, is an unnumbered card that excuses the player from following suit or playing a trump in some variations, and that acts as the strongest trump in others.

The 54-card 'tarock' deck contains:
8 cards each in four suits (usually French), the "pip" cards being stripped out leaving 1 to 4 in the red suits (Ace highest) and 10 to 7 in the black suits (Ten highest). The court cards remain the same.
22 tarocks as permanent trumps, including the Sküs (the Fool) as an unnumbered Tarock XXII, the Mond as Tarock XXI and the Pagat as Tarock I, which are collectively known as the Trull or "Honours" and have a special role.

Due to the antiquity of tarot games, the cards are ordered in an archaic ranking. In the plain suits, Kings are always high. With the exception of modern French tarot and Sicilian tarocchi, the ranking in the Latin round suits (cups and coins) or the French red suits (diamonds and hearts) goes from King (high), Queen, Cavalier, Jack, 1, 2, 3 ... 10 (low).

Basic rules of play
Play is typically anti-clockwise; the player to the right of the dealer plays to the first trick. Players must follow suit if they have a card of the suit led, otherwise they must play a trump if possible. The winner of each trick leads to the next.
After the hand has been played, a score is taken based on the point values of the cards in the tricks each player has managed to capture.

Common card values 
The aim in almost all card games of the Tarot family is to make as many points as possible from the cards taken in tricks, the cards having different point values. Those cards which have little or no point value are called various names – Skartins, Ladons or cartes basses depending on the region – but may be referred to as low cards. Cards which have a higher point value may be called counting cards or counters; they usually include the Fool (Excuse or Sküs), the I (Pagat Petit, Bagatto or Little Man) and the XXI (Mond) plus all the court cards. In such a case, the low cards are the remaining tarots (II to XX) and all the pip cards. Not all games follow this precisely; in some games, other cards are included among the counters. However, the division of counters and low cards described is the most common and is often accompanied by the following 'standard' card values:

 Oudlers or Trull cards – Trumps I, XXI and the Fool: 5 points
 Kings: 5 points
 Queens: 4 points
 Cavaliers or Knights: 3 points
 Knaves, Valets or Jacks: 2 points
 Low cards: 1 point

Tarot scoring 
The system by which players work out their scores in almost all Tarot games may appear "eccentric and puzzling", but the rationale to it is that, originally, the cards were each valued at one less point than that shown above (e.g. Kings were worth 4 points and low cards had no point value), but every trick taken scored one point. Dummett argues that the tedious work of counting tricks card points separately, led players to fuse the two processes into a single operation. There are several practical methods, but all are designed to achieve the same aim: a quick and relatively simple way of calculating the score.

A very common system used in many 54-card Tarock games is counting in packets of three. Under the original scoring scheme, the pack would have been worth 52 points and there would have been 18 points for the 18 tricks making a total of 70 points in total; thus, in most cases, a declarer needs 36 points to win. Mayr and Sedlaczek described 3 common systems:

Counting in threes with low cards 
The first, easiest and oldest method is counting in threes with low cards. A player gathers the cards won in tricks and groups them into triplets each comprising one counting card and two low cards. Each triplet scores the value of the counter only e.g. a Queen and two low cards scores 4. In addition, a triplet of three low cards scores exactly 1 point. In some games, players may end up with one or two cards over. Two remaining low cards are rounded up to score 1 point; a single low card is rounded down to zero. This is the simplest method but it doesn't work if a player does not have enough low cards for every counter.

Counting in threes with a 2-point deduction 
The second method, popular in Vienna, was developed later: counting in threes with a 2-point deduction. Cards are grouped in threes again, but the composition is irrelevant. Within each triplet the card values are added and then 2 points are deducted from the total. So, for example, a Queen, Cavalier and Ten are worth 4 + 3 + 1 – 2 = 6 points. Players try to ensure that any odd cards left over are low cards. Again, two low cards are worth 1 point and a single low card is worthless.

Counting in fractions 
The third method is a new development and the most precise, but also the most complicated and least used: counting in fractions. Cards are given fractional values as follows: Trull cards and Kings – , Queens – , Cavaliers – , Jacks –  and low cards –  each. In this way individual cards can be counted. So a Queen, Cavalier and Ten are worth  +  +  = 6 points, producing the same result as the second method.

A variant of this method is used for Tarot Nouveau or French tarot, where low cards are each worth half a point, and are combined with a counting card. The fractional values of each of the cards are as follows: Oudlers and Kings - , Queens - , Cavaliers - , Jacks -  and low cards -  each. The same method is used as above but counting only two cards. For example, a Queen (worth 3 1/2 points) and a low card (1/2 point) would be counted together to make 4.

Tarot images
For the purpose of the rules, the numbering of the trumps is all that matters. The symbolic tarot images have no effect in the game itself other than influencing the naming of a few of the cards (Fool, Mond, Pagat, Little Man). The design traditions of these decks subsequently evolved independently and they often bear only numbers and whimsical scenes arbitrarily chosen by the engraver. However, there are still traditional sequences of images in which the common lineage is visible; e.g. the moon that is commonly visible at the bottom left corner of the trump card 21 stems from confusion of the German word Mond, meaning "moon", with Italian mondo and French monde, meaning "world", the usual symbol associated with the trump card 21 on Italian suited tarots.

See also
 Hofämterspiel
 Mantegna Tarocchi

Footnotes

References

Further reading
 Alscher, Hans-Joachim, ed. (2003). Tarock – mein einziges Vergnügen ... Geschichte eines europäischen Kartenspiels. Brandstätter, Vienna, .
 Bamberger, Johannes (2011). Tarock: die schönsten Varianten, Perlen-Reihe Vol. 640, 22nd edition, Perlen-Reihe, Vienna. 
 Decker, Ronald, Thierry Depaulis and Michael Dummett (2002) [1996]. A Wicked Pack of Cards: The Origins of the Occult Tarot. London: Duckworth. 
 Dummett, Michael (1980). Twelve Tarot Games. Duckworth, London. 
 Dummett, Michael (1980). The Game of Tarot. Duckworth, London. 
 
 
 Livingstone, Ian and James Wallis (2019). Board Games in 100 Moves. 
 Mayr, Wolfgang and Sedlaczek (2015). Die Kultur Geschichte des Tarock Spiels: Geschichten über Tarock und Seine Berühmten Spieler. Atelier, Vienna. 
 Mayr, Wolfgang and Sedlaczek (2016). Die Strategie des Tarockspiels. Königrufen, Zwanzigerrufen, Neunzehnerrufen, Dreiertarock, Strohmanntarock, 5th expanded ed., Atelier, Vienna.

External links

 Tarocchi History at Trionfi.com
 Card Games: Tarot Games at Pagat.com
 What is Tarot? It's not what you think! at Bloggernews.net
 Rules for Tarot games at Tarocchino.com (archived)

 
15th-century card games
Italian card games